José Zacarías Tallet (18 October 1893 – 21 December 1989) was a Cuban writer. He was born in Matanzas and died in Havana. He won the National Literary Prize in 1984.

Works
 1951 - La semilla estéril, Publicaciones del Ministerio de Educación, La Habana.
 1969 - Órbita de José Zacarías Tallet, Editorial UNEAC, La Habana.
 1978 - Vivo aún, Editorial Letras Cubanas, La Habana.
 1979 - Poesía y Prosa, Editorial Letras Cubanas, La Habana.
 1983 - Curiosidades de la Historia, Editorial Letras Cubanas, La Habana.
 1985 - Evitemos Gazapos y Gazapitos, Editorial Letras Cubanas, La Habana.

References

Cuban male writers
1893 births
1989 deaths